The U.S. Central Intelligence Agency's Mission Center for Counterterrorism (often referred to as the Counterterrorism Mission Center or CTMC, formerly the Counterterrorism Center, or simply CTC) is a division of the CIA's Directorate of Operations, established in 1986. It was renamed during an agency restructuring in 2015, and is distinct from the National Counterterrorism Center (NCTC), which is a separate entity. The most recent publicly known Assistant Director for Counterterrorism Mission Center was Chris Wood who led the organization from 2015 to 2017.

Foundation and early years
The Counterterrorism Mission Center was established as the Counterterrorism Center in February 1986, under the CIA's Directorate of Operations, with Duane Clarridge as its first director.  It was an "interdisciplinary" body; many of its personnel, and most its chiefs, were drawn from the CIA's Directorate of Operations, but others came from the Directorates of Intelligence and Science and Technology.  Observing that terrorism knew no geographical boundaries, the CTC was designed to cut across the traditional region-based bodies of the CIA.

Discredited by the Iran-Contra scandal of 1986, the original aims later gave way to a more analytical role. This did not prevent the Center contemplating an "Eagle" drone aircraft project in 1986–7, which could have been used to spy on hostage-takers in Lebanon. The idea was unrealistic in terms of the technical abilities of the time, but can be compared to the Predator drone eventually inaugurated in 2000.

Notable early members included Vincent Cannistraro, Chief of Operations and Analysis from 1988 to 1991, Robert Baer, from the Directorate of Operations, and Stanley Bedlington, a "senior analyst."

The 1990s
In the early 1990s, the CTC had no more than a hundred personnel, divided into about a dozen branches.  Besides branches specializing in Lebanon's Hezbollah, and secular groups like the Japanese Red Army, another concentrated on Sunni Islamist radicalism, primarily in Algeria. Former CTC Director Cofer Black illustrates the evolution of the organization's priorities throughout the 1990s during the 9/11 commission, explaining:During the early and mid 1990's, al-Qa'ida was not our principal counterterrorism target. Until September 11, Hizballah had killed more Americans than any terrorist group. The Egyptian Islamic Jihad, Hamas, Shining Path in Peru, Abu Saayef in the Philippines, 17 November in Greece, were all threats to Americans or American interests. Personnel and financial resources, management attention, policymaker interest were spread among these groups.In January 1996, the CTC opened the Bin Laden Issue Station to track Osama bin Laden and al-Qaeda, with Michael Scheuer, formerly in charge of the CTC's Islamic Extremist Branch, as its first head.  The reasons were similar to those for the establishment of the CTC itself. The new station, unlike the traditional country-based ones, was not geographically limited and drew its personnel from across the U.S. intelligence community.

Geoffrey O'Connell was Director of the CTC from 1997 until Cofer Black became Director in June 1999, as part of a reshuffle by CIA chief George Tenet, who was embarking on a plan to deal with al-Qaeda.  At the same time Tenet made one of his executives Richard Blee head of the unnamed section in charge of the Bin Laden Station.

Paul Pillar became chief of analysis in 1993, and by 1997, he was the center's deputy director.  But in summer 1999 he suffered a clash of styles with Cofer Black.  Soon after, Pillar left the organization.  He was replaced as deputy director by Ben Bonk.  Henry Crumpton was head of operations in the late 1990s, and came back after 9/11 as chief of a new Special Operations section.

In the late 1990s, the CIA began to set up Counterterrorist Intelligence Centers, in collaboration with the intelligence services of individual countries to deal with Islamist militants.  The CTICs spread widely after the September 11, 2001 attacks, existing in more than two dozen countries by 2005.  Officers from the host nations serving in the CTICs were vetted by the CIA, and usually supervised by the local CIA chief of station.

"The Plan" (1999–2001)
In December 1998 CIA chief George Tenet "declared war" on Osama bin Laden.  Early in 1999 Tenet ordered the CTC to conduct a review of the CIA's operational strategy, with the aim of creating "a new, comprehensive plan of attack" against al-Qaeda. By mid-September, the result of this review, known simply as "The Plan", had been briefed to CIA operational level personnel, and to the NSA, the FBI, and other partners.

Once Cofer Black had finalized his operational plan, Charles E. Allen, associate deputy director of Central Intelligence for Collection, created a dedicated al-Qaeda cell with officers from across the intelligence community.  This cell met daily, focusing on penetrating the Afghan sanctuary, and ensuring that collection initiatives were synchronized with operational plans.  Allen met with Tenet on a weekly basis to review initiatives.

The CIA increasingly concentrated its diminished resources on counterterrorism, so that resources for this activity increased sharply, in contrast to the general trend.  At least some of the Plan's more modest aspirations were translated into action.  Intelligence collection efforts on bin Laden and al-Qaeda increased significantly from 1999.

The core 9/11 hijackers emerge
Beginning in September 1999, the CTC picked up multiple signs that bin Laden had set in motion major terrorist attacks for the turn of the year.  The CIA set in motion what Black later described as the "largest collection and disruption activity in the history of mankind".  They focused on known al-Qaeda terrorists, and on senior personnel both inside and outside Afghanistan.

Amid this activity, in November–December 1999 Mohamed Atta, Marwan al-Shehhi, Ziad Jarrah, and Nawaf al-Hazmi visited Afghanistan, where they were selected by al-Qaeda for the 9/11 operation. In late 1999, the NSA picked up traces of an "operational cadre" consisting of al-Hazmi, his younger brother Salem, and Khalid al-Mihdhar, who were planning to go to Kuala Lumpur, Malaysia, in January 2000.  A CTC officer sought permission to conduct surveillance on the men.  At about this time the SOCOM-DIA data mining operation "Able Danger" also identified a potential al-Qaeda unit, consisting of the future leading 9/11 hijackers, and termed them the "Brooklyn cell". Altogether, the operation found five cells, including two of the three cells involved in the 9/11 attack.

The CIA erratically tracked al-Hazmi and al-Mihdhar as they traveled to and attended the al-Qaeda summit in Kuala Lumpur in early January 2000.

The Predator drone (2000–2001)

In autumn 2000, a series of flights over Afghanistan by Predator drones, under the joint control of the U.S. Air Force and the CTC, produced probable sightings of bin Laden.  CTC Director Black advocated arming Predators with missiles to try to launch a targeted killing of bin Laden, but there were legal and technical issues.  Black continued to lobby for Predators armed with adapted Hellfire anti-tank missiles under the new Bush administration in 2001.  On Black's advice, Director George Tenet raised the matter at the long-awaited Cabinet-level Principals Committee meeting on terrorism on September 4, 2001, and received authorization to deploy the system.

9/11 and the War on Terror (2001–2015)

After the September 11, 2001 attacks on the World Trade Center and the Pentagon, some CTC staff were exempted from an order to evacuate the CIA headquarters building at Langley.  They included the shift of the Global Response Center on the exposed sixth floor, which Black had argued was essential to keep operating during the crisis.  Tenet finally agreed with Black that their lives would have to be put at risk.

The CTC obtained passenger lists from the planes used in the attack, and identified Khalid al-Mihdhar and Nawaf al-Hazmi, whose names they had first linked with terrorism in the winter of 1999–2000. Tenet later proposed inserting CIA teams into Afghanistan to assist local warlords in the fight against al-Qaeda.

The CIA geared up to take the lead in the attack on al-Qaeda and the Taliban in Afghanistan.  The Northern Afghanistan Liaison Team (NALT) team, led by Gary Schroen, entered the country once more on September 26.  A new branch was added to the CTC, named CTC Special Operations, or CTC/SO, headed by Henry Crumpton, with the aim of locating and destroying al-Qaeda resources. Execution of this mission was nowhere more evident than at Qala-i-Jangi, a 19th-century fortress on the outskirts of the northern Afghan town of Mazar-i-Sharif, when it fell to American allies.

A CIA Directorate of Support security wing being paramilitary, under the innocuous title Global Response Staff (GRS) was created after 9/11. Scorpions known for operating in Iraq, was a creation of the CIA’s. 

Gina Haspel, who would later become CIA Director, requested a transfer to CTC in 2001. Her first day was September 11, 2001. She continued at CTC for three years following the attacks.

Restructuring to CTMC (2015–present) 
In 2015, Director of CIA John Brennan introduced sweeping changes to the agency in a modernization effort. In addition to the creation of the first new directorate for the agency in nearly fifty years, many of the changes surrounded the creation of 10 new “mission centers” modeled on CTC, which combine analysts and operators in hybrid units focused on specific regions or security threats. Most track longstanding CIA assignments, with centers devoted to weapons proliferation, for example, and the Near East. These centers largely replicated the structure of CTC, which by 2015 had grown in size and mission from the war on terror. The changes narrowed CTC's scope, led to the reassignment of its director, Michael D'Andrea, to the newly formed Iran Mission Center, and gave CTC a new name, the Mission Center for Counterterrorism. The name was in line with the nine other announced mission centers, but was criticized by members of the agency even otherwise in support of the changes, for being clunky. With the move, the role of Director of the Counterterrorism Center was renamed Assistant Director for Counterterrorism Mission Center, and Chris Wood was the first to occupy the newly renamed office. Reviews of the implementation of the changes at CTMC and elsewhere with the new mission centers have been mixed, with parochialism reportedly continuing to belabor the reorganization.

In 2017, the Agency announced the creation of the Korea Mission Center, the 11th such group modeled on the structure of CTC, charged with tackling the threat posed by North Korea.

In March 2020, the Trump administration acting Director of National Intelligence Richard Grennell relieved CTMC Deputy Chief of Analysis, and 40 year intelligence veteran Russel Travers from his position as Acting Director of the National Counter-Terrorism Center (NCTC) during a surprise reshuffle. Reports initially suggested he was fired in order to be replaced with Christopher C. Miller, and while ODNI insisted Travers was afforded the opportunity to return to CIA, former coworkers insisted to the Washington Post that he was afforded only the opportunity to retire. Long seen as redundancy by some in departments of the constituent agencies of the Intelligence Community for having a similar and sometimes overlapping mission with what they see as the territory better left to their units like CTMC, the Trump administration's larger move to downsize NCTC was less surprising to most than the abrupt dismissal. Travers' deputy on loan from the National Security Agency was also relieved in the shakeup, and returned to a position at NSA.

In November 2020, president-elect Joe Biden reportedly considered Darrell M. Blocker, who served as former deputy director of the Mission Center, as a candidate for the role of CIA Director.

Director history

See also
 13 Hours: The Secret Soldiers of Benghazi
 Counterterrorist Intelligence Center
 Private military company

References

Central Intelligence Agency
Central Intelligence Agency, Counterterrorist Center